Draba ecuadoriana is a species of flowering plant in the family Brassicaceae. It is found only in Ecuador. Its natural habitat is rocky areas. It is threatened by habitat loss. Creeping herb, pubescent, rosette leaves. White flowers with lilac tints. Green fruits with purple.

References

ecuadoriana
Endemic flora of Ecuador
Critically endangered flora of South America
Taxonomy articles created by Polbot